Paratettix meridionalis is the type species of ground-hopper in its genus, which belongs to the subfamily Tetriginae and tribe Tetrigini.  Its distribution includes: southern Europe, northern Africa, Arabian peninsula and records from Mexico and no subspecies are listed in the Catalogue of Life or the Orthoptera Species File.

References

External links 
 

Tetrigidae
Orthoptera of Europe
Insects described in 1838